Lagertha Olea Sofie Broch (27 January 18642 May 1952) was a Norwegian illustrator, children's writer and proponent for women's rights.

Personal life
Broch was born in Horten, a daughter of merchant and brewery owner Johan Anthony Zincke Broch and his wife, Fanny Harriet Caroline Gamborg, a priest's daughter from Fredericia, Denmark. She was a sister of social worker Nanna Broch, zoologist Hjalmar Broch, and linguist Olaf Broch. She did not marry.

Career
Broch worked as a teacher in Horten from 1888 to 1902, lecturing in the art of drawing. Her first children's book was published in 1902, and she wrote a total of fifteen books for children. Among her books are Den lille baadbygger from 1904, Fix og hendes venner from 1912, Havebog for barn from 1920, and Naturens eventyr from 1947. She contributed to a number of periodicals, including the women's magazines Husmoderen, Urd and Nylænde, and the children's magazines Barnets blad, Norske gutter and Børnenes jul.

References

1864 births
1952 deaths
People from Horten
Norwegian people of Danish descent
Norwegian illustrators
Norwegian children's writers
Norwegian women children's writers
19th-century Norwegian women writers
20th-century Norwegian women writers
Norwegian women illustrators